Lady Camden is the stage name of Rex Wheeler, an English drag queen resident in the United States who competed on season 14 of RuPaul's Drag Race, placing as the runner-up and winning a cash prize of $50,000.

Early life
Wheeler was born in Camden Town, London, England to Brian Wheeler and Jeanne Pacella, who met at Brian's job at the Electric Ballroom. Wheeler attended the Acland Burghley School and the Royal Ballet School.

Career

Ballet 
After dancing with the Slovak National Ballet, Wheeler danced with Sacramento Ballet from 2010-2015. He then danced and choreographed for Smuin Ballet, based in San Francisco, from 2015-2018. In 2019, he premiered Take Five, a piece he choreographed for Smuin Ballet set to the music of Dave Brubeck.

Drag 

In 2022, Wheeler competed on season 14 of RuPaul's Drag Race as Lady Camden. She won episodes 7, 12, and 14, as well as three cash prizes of $5,000. She landed in the bottom 7 on the Snatch Game episode, and had to participate in a lip-sync tournament, winning the second round against Bosco.

In the finale, she reached the final two with Willow Pill and the two queens participated in a lip-sync battle to Cher's cover version of ABBA's "Gimme! Gimme! Gimme! (A Man After Midnight)". She lost the lip-sync and finished as the runner-up, winning a cash prize of $50,000.

Personal life 
Wheeler lives in California and is openly gay. During the COVID-19 pandemic, he moved to Sacramento, before returning to San Francisco.

Filmography

Television

Web series

Awards and nominations

References

External links
 

Year of birth missing (living people)
Living people
American drag queens
English drag queens
Gay entertainers
LGBT people from California
People from Camden Town
People from Los Angeles
People from Sacramento, California
Lady Camden